West Indian World was a weekly newspaper founded in 1971 in London, England, by Vincentian journalist Aubrey Baynes. Under its masthead was the strapline: "Britain's First National West Indian Weekly". The newspaper continued publication until 1985.

History 

Launched at a party on 16 June 1971, with claims to be the first West Indian weekly in London, the newspaper cost 5p, had 20 pages and a print run of 30,000 copies. Baynes has been described as "the true father of the Caribbean/African press in the UK", having previously started the lifestyle magazine Daylight International and edited the short-lived weekly Magnet News. West Indian World struggled financially because of lack of advertising. In 1973, the newspaper was acquired from Baynes by publisher Arif Ali.

Notable staff and contributors to West Indian World over the years included Lionel Morrison, Barbara Blake Hannah, Lindsay Barrett, Neil Kenlock, Flip Fraser, and others.

See also
 West Indian Gazette, founded 1958.
 Caribbean Times, founded 1981
 The Voice, founded 1982

References

External links 
 "West Indian World – Early Edition", Graham Rivers Architects.

Afro-Caribbean culture in London
Black British culture in London
Black British mass media
Defunct newspapers published in the United Kingdom
National newspapers published in the United Kingdom
Newspapers published in London
Publications disestablished in 1985
Publications established in 1971